This list of sequenced algal genomes contains algal species known to have publicly available complete genome sequences that have been assembled, annotated and published. Unassembled genomes are not included, nor are organelle-only sequences. For plant genomes see the list of sequenced plant genomes. For plastid sequences, see the list of sequenced plastomes. For all kingdoms, see the list of sequenced genomes.

Dinoflagellates (Alveolata) 
See also List of sequenced protist genomes.

Cryptomonad

Glaucophyte

Green algae

Haptophyte

Heterokonts/Stramenopiles

Red algae (Rhodophyte)

Rhizaria

References 

Plant